The Yvy Marãeỹ Foundation is an institution which advocates for Guaraní language, its diffusion, teaching and research. It is headquartered in San Lorenzo, Paraguay.

It obtained its legal capacity in February 2007, per Decree No. 9184. Its vision is for a multilingual and intercultural Paraguayan society, promoting cultural and linguistic sovereignty, national identity, cultural and linguistic rights and social inclusion of all Paraguayans.

The Foundation organized three International Seminars on Translation, Terminology and Minoritized Languages in 2016, 2017, and 2018. They have published IT dictionaries and reports, and they are currently collaborating in the translation of Facebook and other websites.

Yvy Marãe'ỹ Foundation is chaired by Miguel Ángel Verón, who in March 2018 signed an agreement with the Senate of Paraguay to facilitate Guarani interpreters and language trainers.

References

Further reading

External links 

Official website (in Spanish or Guaraní)
  

San Lorenzo, Paraguay
Guarani languages
Educational organisations based in Paraguay
Educational institutions established in 2007
2007 establishments in Paraguay
Foundations based in Paraguay